The mayor of York, Pennsylvania has been the city's chief executive since it was incorporated on 	January 11, 1887. As of 2019, the city has had 27 mayors.

Mayors of York

References